Miss Bala may refer to:

 Miss Bala (2011 film), a Mexican crime drama
 Miss Bala (2019 film), an American thriller based on the 2011 film